Didehban or Dideh Ban may refer to:
 Didehban, East Azerbaijan
 Didehban, Fars